Antoine Roussel (born 21 November 1989) is a French professional ice hockey left winger who is currently an unrestricted free agent. He most recently played for the Arizona Coyotes of the National Hockey League (NHL). Born in France, Roussel first played hockey there before moving to Quebec at the age of 16. After four years in the Quebec Major Junior Hockey League (QMJHL), he turned professional and played in the American Hockey League (AHL) and ECHL, minor leagues in North America. Signed by the Dallas Stars of the National Hockey League (NHL) in 2012, he made his NHL debut in 2013 for the club. Regarded as a physical player, Roussel has consistently been one of the NHL's leaders in penalty minutes since he entered the league. He has scored 10 or more goals and earned 100 PIM in the same season four times in his career. Internationally Roussel has represented the French national team both at the junior and senior level, including multiple World Championships.

Early life
Roussel was born in Roubaix, France. He first played rugby as a child, but was released from his team after repeatedly running off the field during the heated summer practices. As a result, his mother Sarah enrolled him in hockey, deciding the cooler rink would benefit Roussel. As a youth, he played in the 2002 Quebec International Pee-Wee Hockey Tournament with a team from Nantes. At the age of 16, Roussel and his family moved to Canada, settling in Quebec. He also holds Canadian citizenship.

Playing career

Junior
After arriving in Canada in 2006, Roussel played midget hockey for the Collège Charles-Lemoyne Riverains in Longueuil. Later that season, Roussel joined the Chicoutimi Saguenéens of the QMJHL, where he played for four years.

Professional
Undrafted in the NHL Entry Draft, Roussel signed an AHL contract on 9 August 2010 with the Providence Bruins, where he played the 2010–11 season. After being a healthy scratch for several Providence games, he was temporarily reassigned to the Reading Royals of the ECHL, where he played in five games.

Roussel was not offered another contract by the Bruins, but was later invited to attend the Vancouver Canucks' prospect camp. His performance there led to him signing a contract with the Chicago Wolves, which at the time were the Canucks' minor league affiliate in the AHL. He played for the Wolves for the 2011–12 season.

Dallas Stars
On 2 July 2012, Roussel signed a contract with the Dallas Stars. During the 2012–13 season, Roussel split his time between Dallas and their AHL affiliate, the Texas Stars. For the 2013–14 season, Roussel played with the Dallas Stars for the entire season, playing 81 games. On 22 July 2014, the Stars announced that Roussel had signed a four-year, $8 million contract extension with the team.

During the 2016–17 season on 18 February 2017, Roussel scored his first NHL hat trick against the Tampa Bay Lightning. He was the second ever French-born NHL player to do so, joining Paul MacLean. A hand injury would end his season in early March.

Vancouver Canucks
After six seasons with the Stars, Roussel left as a free agent and on 1 July 2018, he signed a four-year, $12 million contract with the Vancouver Canucks. Roussel set a career-high in points in 2018–19 with the Canucks, with 31, before suffering a season-ending knee injury on 13 March 2019, during a game against the New York Rangers. Roussel's injury was later revealed to be a torn anterior cruciate ligament or ACL. After undergoing surgery in late-March, Roussel's recovery carried over into the 2019–20 NHL season. Expected to miss the first two months of the season, Roussel made his return to the lineup on 3 December in a 5–2 win over the Ottawa Senators, scoring two goals, including one on his first shift since the injury.

Arizona Coyotes
On 23 July 2021, Roussel was traded, along with Jay Beagle, Loui Eriksson, a 2021 first-round pick, a 2022 second-round pick and a 2023 seventh-round pick, to the Arizona Coyotes in exchange for Oliver Ekman-Larsson and Conor Garland.

International play
Roussel was a member of the French national team at the 2012, 2013, 2014, 2015 and 2017 IIHF World Championships. At the end of the 2014 tournament, he was selected as a Media All-Star after a very successful tournament, scoring 11 points in eight games.

Career statistics

Regular season and playoffs

International

Awards and honors

References

External links

 
 

1989 births
Living people
Arizona Coyotes players
Chicago Wolves players
Chicoutimi Saguenéens (QMJHL) players
Dallas Stars players
Expatriate ice hockey players in Canada
Expatriate ice hockey players in the United States
French expatriate sportspeople in Canada
French expatriate sportspeople in the United States
French ice hockey left wingers
Providence Bruins players
Reading Royals players
Sportspeople from Roubaix
Texas Stars players
Undrafted National Hockey League players
Utica Comets players
Vancouver Canucks players